Louis F. Bottino (May 2, 1907 – April 5, 1979) was an American educator and politician.

Bottino was born in South Wilmington, Illinois. He went to the public schools in South Wilmington and Gardner, Illinois. He graduated from Beloit College and Columbia University. Bottino served in the United States Marine Corps during World War II. He served as a teacher, coach, and school administrator in Will County, Illinois and Lockport, Illinois. He lived with his wife and family in Lockport, Illinois. Bottino served in the Illinois House of Representatives from 1957 to 1961 and was a Republican.

Notes

External links

1907 births
1979 deaths
People from Grundy County, Illinois
People from Lockport, Illinois
Military personnel from Illinois
Beloit College alumni
Columbia University alumni
Educators from Illinois
Republican Party members of the Illinois House of Representatives
20th-century American politicians
United States Marine Corps personnel of World War II